Adolf Scheithauer (24 July 1926 – 1990) was an Austrian rower. He competed in the men's coxless four event at the 1952 Summer Olympics.

References

External links
 
 

1926 births
1990 deaths
Austrian male rowers
Olympic rowers of Austria
Rowers at the 1952 Summer Olympics
Place of birth missing